The Sanford Pentagon (colloquially known as The Pentagon) is an indoor arena located in Sioux Falls, South Dakota. The Pentagon opened in September 2013 and has a seating capacity of 3,250 spectators. It hosts the Sioux Falls Skyforce of the NBA G League. The facility is known for hosting a wide range of sporting events including: regional youth basketball tournaments, NCAA Division I basketball games, NCAA Division II basketball games and tournaments, mixed martial arts events, and occasional concerts.

Major events

2013
The Pentagon's first major event was hosted on October 10, 2013. The Minnesota Timberwolves played the Milwaukee Bucks in the main court as a preseason exhibition game, and television coverage was provided by Fox Sports North. The Wolves defeated the Bucks by a score of 98–89 in front of an announced crowd of 3,250.

On November 8, 2013, the Pentagon hosted its first NCAA Division I men's basketball game between the then 20th ranked Wisconsin Badgers and the St. John's Red Storm. The game was televised on the Big Ten Network. Wisconsin won the game 86–75 in front of a sellout crowd of 3,523.

2014
On November 18, 2014, the Pentagon hosted an early season non-conference NCAA Division I basketball game between the then 11th ranked Wichita State Shockers and the Memphis Tigers.  The game was televised by ESPN as part of their Tip-Off Marathon programming. The Shockers won that game 71–56 in front of a sellout crowd.

On November 30, 2014, the South Dakota State Jackrabbits took on the Florida Gulf Coast Eagles, winning 71–58. The announced attendance was 3,250 and coverage was provided by Fox Sports North.

For the third and final NCAA Division I basketball game of the 2014–15 season at the Sanford Pentagon, the UNLV Runnin' Rebels played the South Dakota Coyotes on December 13, 2014. UNLV won the game 75-61 and the game was televised by Midco Sports Network and ESPN3.

2015
On March 16, 2015, it was announced that the Iowa State Cyclones men's basketball team would play the Colorado Buffaloes men's basketball team on November 13, 2015, in an early season non-conference match-up.

2020
An early-season Division I basketball tournament—the Crossover Classic—was announced for the Pentagon in 2020. It serves as a de facto replacement for the Battle 4 Atlantis tournament in Nassau, Bahamas, which was cancelled due to the COVID-19 pandemic. Most of the teams that were invited to said tournament were invited to the Crossover Classic.

The site was also home to the Dakota Showcase, which hosted all four division one teams from the Dakotas. This included North Dakota, North Dakota State, South Dakota State, and South Dakota.

Annual/Recurring
On December 11, 2013, it was announced that the Sanford Pentagon would be home to multiple NCAA Division II championships.  These include the 2017 and 2018 NCAA Men's Division II Basketball Championships, the 2015, 2016, and 2018 NCAA Women's Division II Basketball Championships (except for the championship final in 2016, which will be held at Bankers Life Fieldhouse in Indianapolis), and the 2016 and 2020 NCAA Division II Women's Volleyball Championship. Beginning in 2018, it will also be the home to the NAIA Division II men's basketball championship.

Beginning in 2014, it is also home to the NSIC (Northern Sun Intercollegiate Conference) conference basketball tournament.  The NSIC is an NCAA Division II conference with schools located mainly in Minnesota, South Dakota, and North Dakota.

References

External links
Official Site

Basketball venues in South Dakota
College basketball venues in the United States
College volleyball venues in the United States
Indoor arenas in South Dakota
Mixed martial arts venues in the United States
Sports venues in Sioux Falls, South Dakota
NBA G League venues
Sioux Falls Skyforce
2013 establishments in South Dakota